The Winton Motor Carriage Company was a pioneer United States automobile manufacturer based in Cleveland, Ohio. Winton was one of the first American companies to sell a motor car. In 1912 Winton became one of the first American manufacturers of diesel engines.

History

1896–1903
In 1896, Scottish immigrant Alexander Winton, owner of the Winton Bicycle Company, turned from bicycle production to an experimental single-cylinder automobile before starting his car company.

The company was incorporated on March 15, 1897. Its first automobiles were built by hand. Each vehicle had painted sides, padded seats, a leather roof, and gas lamps. B.F. Goodrich made the tires.

By this time, Winton had already produced two fully operational prototype automobiles. However, the new invention was still subject to much skepticism , so to prove his automobile's durability and usefulness, Alexander Winton had his car undergo an  endurance run from Cleveland to New York City.

On March 24, 1898, Robert Allison of Port Carbon, Pennsylvania, became the first person to buy a Winton automobile after seeing the first automobile advertisement in Scientific American. Later that year the Winton Motor Carriage Company sold 21 more vehicles, including one to James Ward Packard, who later founded the Packard automobile company after Winton challenged a very dissatisfied Packard to do better. This is the same mistake that Enzo Ferrari would make with Ferruccio Lamborghini.

Winton sold his first manufactured semi-truck in 1899. More than one hundred Winton vehicles were sold that year, making the company the largest manufacturer of gasoline-powered automobiles in the United States. This success led to the opening of the first automobile dealership by Mr. H. W. Koler in Reading, Pennsylvania. To deliver the vehicles, in 1899, Winton built the first automobile hauler in America. One of these 1899 Wintons was purchased by Larz Anderson and his new wife, Isabel Weld Perkins.

Publicity generated sales. In 1901, the news that both Reginald Vanderbilt and Alfred Vanderbilt had purchased Winton automobiles boosted the company's image substantially. Models at the time were a two-passenger Runabout with a one-cylinder engine (8 hp) and a four-passenger Touring and Mail Delivery Van, also with a one-cylinder engine (9 hp). That year, Winton lost a race at Grosse Pointe to Henry Ford. Winton vowed a comeback and win. The Bullet was defeated by another Ford by famed driver Barney Oldfield, but two more Bullet race cars were built.

In 1903, Dr. Horatio Nelson Jackson made the first successful automobile drive across the United States. On a $50 bet, he purchased a slightly used two-cylinder,  Winton touring car and hired a mechanic to accompany him. Starting in San Francisco, California, ending in Manhattan, New York City, New York. The trip lasted 63 days, 12 hours, and 30 minutes, including breakdowns and delays while waiting for parts to arrive (especially in Cleveland.) The two men often drove miles out of the way to find a passable road, repeatedly hoisted the Winton up and over rocky terrain and mud holes with a block and tackle, or were pulled out of soft sand by horse teams. In 1903, there were only 150 miles of paved road in the entire country, all inside city limits. There were no road signs or maps. They once paid the exorbitant price of $5 for five gallons of gasoline. Jackson and his partner followed rivers and streams, transcontinental railroad tracks, sheep trails, and dirt back roads.

1904–1924
The 1904 Winton was a five-passenger tonneau-equipped tourer which sold for US$2,500. By contrast, the Enger 40 was US$2,000, the FAL US$1,750, an Oakland 40 US$1,600, the Cole 30 and Colt Runabout US$1,500, while the (1913) Lozier Light Six Metropolitan started at US$3,250, American's lowest-priced model was US$4,250, and Lozier's Big Six were US$5,000 and up.

Models (1904)
{|class="wikitable"
|-
! Type !! Engine !! HP !! Wheelbase !! Transmission
|-
|Touring-5p. ||Two-cylinder ||20 ||94.5" ||2-speed sliding-gear
|-
|Touring-5p. ||Four-cylinder ||24 ||104" ||2-speed sliding-gear
|}

Winton's flat-mounted water-cooled straight-twin engine, situated amidships of the car, produced .

Models (1914)
{|class="wikitable"
|-
! Model !! Engine !! HP !! Wheelbase
|-
|Model 20 ||Six-cylinder ||48.6 ||130"
|}

Winton continued to successfully market automobiles to upscale consumers through the 1910s, but sales began to fall in the early 1920s. This was due to the very conservative nature of the company, both in terms of technical development and styling. Only one sporting model was offered — the Sport Touring, with the majority of Wintons featuring tourer, sedan, limousine and town car styling. The Winton Motor Carriage Company ceased automobile production on February 11, 1924.

Models (1922)
{|class="wikitable"
|-
! Model !! Engine !! HP !! Wheelbase
|-
|Model 40 ||Six-cylinder ||70/72 ||132"
|}

Winton Engine Company
In 1912, Winton started producing diesel engines for stationary and marine use, and gasoline engines for heavy vehicles, independent of Winton's automobile production. The subsidiary Winton Engine Company remained successful while Winton's automotive sales went into decline, and would outlive the Winton Motor Carriage Company. Winton became the main supplier of engines for internal combustion-electric powered railcars in the 1920s.

Sale to General Motors
On June 20, 1930, Winton Engine Company was sold to General Motors and on June 30 was reorganized as the Winton Engine Corporation subsidiary of GM. It produced the first practical two-stroke diesel engines in the 400-to-1,200 hp (300 to 900 kW) range, which powered the early diesel locomotives of Electro-Motive Corporation (another GM subsidiary), as well as US Navy submarines. In 1934, a Winton eight-cylinder,  8-201-A diesel engine powered the revolutionary streamlined passenger train the Burlington Zephyr, the first American diesel-powered mainline train. The Winton Engine Corporation provided 201 Series engines for rail use until late 1938, when it was reorganized as the General Motors Cleveland Diesel Engine Division, which produced the GM 567 series locomotive engines, and other large diesels for marine and stationary use. In 1941, locomotive engine production became part of GM's Electro-Motive Division (EMD). In 1962, Cleveland Diesel was absorbed by EMD, which remains in business today as a subsidiary of Progress Rail.

Marine engines
Winton and Cleveland engines were used widely by the US Navy in the Second World War, powering submarines, destroyer escorts, and numerous auxiliaries. The Winton engines were systematically replaced with the more reliable Cleveland engines during refittings during the war.

In popular culture
A purpose-built "Winton Flyer" features prominently in William Faulkner's Pulitzer Prize–winning 1962 novel The Reivers. In fact, the 1969 film version of the novel starring Steve McQueen was known as The Yellow Winton Flyer in the UK.

See also
List of defunct United States automobile manufacturers

Notes

References

External links

Winton sales literature for models A, B, C and Limousine—The description at the site explains the format: "Designed to be folded in various combinations so that the text can be displayed under the corresponding image. In this digital edition each photo is displayed with the corresponding text folded to appear under the photo. The two sides of the complete, unfolded strip are also included as an application/pdf file as the final image."
A collection of Winton magazine advertisements (1902–1917)
A collection of sales literature for the Winton Six 1911, 1912, 1913, and 33
Secondhandgarage.com: History of the Winton Motor Carriage Company

1890s cars
1900s cars
1910s cars
1920s cars
Brass Era vehicles
Defunct companies based in Cleveland
Defunct motor vehicle manufacturers of the United States
Historic American Engineering Record in Ohio
History of Cleveland
Luxury motor vehicle manufacturers
Manufacturing companies based in Cleveland
Motor vehicle manufacturers based in Ohio
Vehicle manufacturing companies disestablished in 1962
Vehicle manufacturing companies established in 1897
Vehicles introduced in 1898